Juan Bautista Hernández Pérez (born December 24, 1962) is a retired boxer from Cuba, who won the gold medal in the Bantamweight division (-54 kg) at age seventeen at the 1980 Summer Olympics in Moscow. In the final he defeated Venezuela's Bernardo Piñango on points (5-0).

1980 Olympic results
 Round of 64: bye
 Round of 32: Defeated Sándor Farkas (Hungary) by decision, 4-1
 Round of 16: Defeated Ayele Mohammed (Ethiopia) referee stopped contest in second round
 Quarterfinal: Defeated Geraldi Issaick (Tanzania) referee stopped contest in first round
 Semifinal: Defeated Michael Anthony (Guyana) by decision, 5-0
 Final: Defeated Bernardo Piñango (Venezuela) by decision, 5-0

External links
 Juan Hernández at databaseOlympics.com
 

1962 births
Living people
Olympic boxers of Cuba
Boxers at the 1980 Summer Olympics
Olympic gold medalists for Cuba
Olympic medalists in boxing
Cuban male boxers
Medalists at the 1980 Summer Olympics
Bantamweight boxers
People from Granma Province
20th-century Cuban people